Kevin Willmott  (born August 31, 1959) is an Academy Award Winning American film director and screenwriter, and professor of film at the University of Kansas. He is known for work focusing on black issues including writing and directing Ninth Street, C.S.A.: The Confederate States of America, and Bunker Hill. His The Only Good Indian (2009) was a feature film about Native American children at an Indian boarding school and the forced assimilation that took place. In Jayhawkers (2014), he followed the life of Wilt Chamberlain, Phog Allen and the 1956 Kansas Jayhawks basketball team. Willmott has collaborated with Spike Lee, with whom he shared an Academy Award for Best Adapted Screenplay for BlacKkKlansman. The two again collaborated in writing Da 5 Bloods, released worldwide digitally on June 12, 2020.

Biography 
Willmott grew up in Junction City, Kansas, and received a BA in Drama from Marymount College. He received a M.F.A. in Dramatic Writing from New York University. He has worked as a screenwriter and film director, known for work related to African-American history and contemporary issues. In 2017, Willmott taught classes in a bulletproof vest in protest of the ability of students and staff to carry concealed weapons on the campus.

He won the Best Director award at the American Indian Film Festival for The Only Good Indian. Willmott's next film, Jayhawkers, received funding through Kickstarter, a crowdsourcing website.

In 2019, Wilmott won an Oscar for his work on BlacKkKlansman.

Filmography

Crew

Film

Television

Acting

References

External links 
 
 On Story – A Conversation with Kevin Willmott 

1959 births
African-American Catholics
African-American film directors
Best Adapted Screenplay Academy Award winners
Best Adapted Screenplay BAFTA Award winners
Film directors from Kansas
Living people
People from Junction City, Kansas
Place of birth missing (living people)
Tisch School of the Arts alumni
University of Kansas faculty